Sorbus harrowiana (Harrow rowan) is a flowering plant shrub. It is a Rowan species. It is cultivated as an ornamental plant in parks and gardens.

harrowiana